Haidar Al-Shaïbani (born March 31, 1984) is a Canadian soccer coach and former player who works as a video analyst and goalkeeper coach at Saint-Étienne.

Career
Haidar Al-Shaïbani was born March 31, 1984 in Setif, Algeria.

University
Al-Shaibani played University soccer at University of Western Ontario from 2004 to 2007, where he was named Ontario University Athletics first team All Star in four consecutive years (2004 to 2007). In 2007 Al-Shaibani was named OUA MVP and Canadian Inter-university Sport first team All-Canadian.

In his four years with the Mustangs, he led them to three OUA championships, and two bronze medals at CIS National Championships.

Professional
He began his professional career in 2002 with London City in the Canadian Professional Soccer League. He featured in the 2003 Open Canada Cup final against Metro Lions, where they won the title 4–2 in a penalty shootout. In 2005, he received the CPSL Goalkeeper of the Year award. In 2006, he signed with division rivals North York Astros. During his tenure with North York he helped clinch a postseason berth in 2007. In 2009, he went abroad to France to sign with Nîmes Olympique in Ligue 2.  Al-Shaïbani made his debut for Nîmes on August 25, 2009 in a Coupe de la Ligue match against Troyes. He has also featured for the club in the Coupe de France.

International career
Haidar represented Canada at two Summer Universiade, Bangkok 2007 and  Belgrade 2009. He back stopped Canada to its best performance in history at the Universiade in men's soccer with a fourth-place finish at the 2007 Games in Bangkok, Thailand .

He earned his first call up for Canada on 14 May 2010 for the friendly matches against Argentina and Venezuela on 29 May 2010. He earned his first cap for Canada as a sub in the second half against Venezuela where he helped the team to a 1–1 tie.

On September 4, 2010 Coach Stephen Hart, selected Al-Shaïbani for the Friendly games in Toronto and Montreal, against Peru September 4, 2010 and Honduras September 7, 2010.

Managerial career 
In 2017, he was named the video analyst and goalkeeper coach for AS Saint-Étienne in Ligue 1.

Personal life
Al-Shaïbani was born in Sétif, Algeria to an Iraqi father and a Ukrainian mother. His family moved to Canada in 1998.

References

External links

1984 births
Living people
Nîmes Olympique players
Expatriate footballers in France
Canadian Soccer League (1998–present) players
Canadian soccer players
Canadian people of Iraqi descent
Canadian people of Ukrainian descent
Canada men's international soccer players
Canadian expatriate soccer players
North York Astros players
Footballers from Sétif
Algerian emigrants to Canada
University of Western Ontario alumni
2011 CONCACAF Gold Cup players
Ligue 2 players
Le Puy Foot 43 Auvergne players
London City players
Association football goalkeepers